Michel Vauzelle (born 15 August 1944) is a French politician who served as Keeper of the Seals of France, Minister of Justice under Prime Minister Pierre Bérégovoy from 1992 to 1993. A member of the Socialist Party (PS), he also served as Mayor of Arles from 1995 to 1998 and President of the Regional Council of Provence-Alpes-Côte d'Azur from 1998 until 2015.

A native of Montélimar, Vauzelle was a Member of Parliament (MP) for Bouches-du-Rhône from 1986 to 1992 and again from 1997 to 2002 and 2007 to 2017. He was first elected at-large (1986–1988), before representing the department's 16th constituency. In 2007, he defeated Union for a Popular Movement (UMP) incumbent Roland Chassain who had previously defeated him in 2002. Vauzelle, who had a narrower victory against a National Front (FN) candidate in 2012, did not contest the 2017 legislative election, in which the seat was won by Monica Michel of La République En Marche! (LREM), a first-time candidate.

References

External links
Official website
National Assembly page

1944 births
Living people
20th-century French lawyers
20th-century French politicians
21st-century French politicians
People from Montélimar
Politicians from Provence-Alpes-Côte d'Azur
Sciences Po alumni
Departmental councillors (France)
Mayors of places in Provence-Alpes-Côte d'Azur
Presidents of the Regional Council of Provence-Alpes-Côte d'Azur
Socialist Party (France) politicians
French Ministers of Justice
Deputies of the 8th National Assembly of the French Fifth Republic
Deputies of the 9th National Assembly of the French Fifth Republic
Deputies of the 11th National Assembly of the French Fifth Republic
Deputies of the 13th National Assembly of the French Fifth Republic
Deputies of the 14th National Assembly of the French Fifth Republic